The 2005–2006 FIG Artistic Gymnastics World Cup series was a series of stages where events in men's and women's artistic gymnastics were contested. The series was a two-year long competition culminating at a final event, the World Cup Final in 2006. A number of qualifier stages were held. The top 3 gymnast in each apparatus at the qualifier events would receive medals and prize money. Gymnasts who finished in the top 8 would also receive points that would be added up to a ranking which would qualify individual gymnasts for the biennial World Cup Final.

Stages

Medalists

Men

Women

See also 
 2005–2006 FIG Rhythmic Gymnastics World Cup series

References 

Artistic Gymnastics World Cup
2005 in gymnastics
2006 in gymnastics